The following is a list of tehsils of the Indian state of Haryana.

List of divisions, tehsils, sub tehsils and blocks of Haryana

References

Tehsils in Haryana
Haryana
Haryana-related lists